Edgar William Lindenmeyer (July 18, 1901 – July 24, 1981) was an American football player. Lindenmeyer attended the Missouri Military Academy (MMA) before enrolling at the University of Missouri.  He played college football at the tackle position for the Missouri Tigers football team from 1924 to 1926.  He was selected by the International News Service (INS), Newspaper Enterprise Association (NEA) and several others as a first-team player on the 1925 College Football All-America Team.  The Associated Press and All-American Board named a second-team All-American.  Lindenmeyer was the University of Missouri's first All-American athlete. He later became a physical education teacher and the head football coach at Lake Forest High School in Lake Forest, Illinois he served as head football coach from 1935 to 1951 and compiled a 96–27–10 record.

References

1901 births
1981 deaths
American football tackles
Missouri Tigers football players
High school football coaches in Illinois
People educated at Missouri Military Academy
Players of American football from Wisconsin